Keith Andes (born John Charles Andes, July 12, 1920 – November 11, 2005) was an American film, radio, musical theater, stage and television actor.

Early life and education
Andes was born to Mr. and Mrs. William G. Andes in Ocean City, New Jersey. By the age of 12, he was featured on the radio.

The family moved to Upper Darby, Pennsylvania, near Philadelphia. Andes attended Upper Darby High School and found work on radio singing and acting throughout his high school years. 

He attended St Edward's School in Oxford, England, and graduated from Temple University in Philadelphia, where he was a member of Sigma Pi fraternity, in 1943 with a bachelor's degree in education. While at Temple, he did not participate in the university's theater program, but spent his time working as a disc jockey for several Philadelphia-area radio stations, including KYW, WFIL, and WIP. After graduating from Temple, he studied voice at the Philadelphia Conservatory of Music in Center City Philadelphia. He was known for his baritone voice.

Career

Early performances
He began his acting career while serving in the United States Army Air Forces during World War II. He served three years and sang and acted in United Service Organization shows. He was cast in the play Winged Victory and then cast by 20th Century Fox in the film Winged Victory (1944).

In 1947, Andes received a Theater World Award for his Broadway debut performance in a revival of the operetta The Chocolate Soldier.

In 1947, he had a role in the movie The Farmer's Daughter, the film that won Loretta Young her Best Actress Oscar. Andes, Lex Barker and James Arness played the title character's powerfully built and highly protective brothers.

Andes' first leading role in a feature film came with Project X (1949), a low-budget, independent movie.

In June 1950, he joined the cast of Kiss Me, Kate on Broadway, taking over the lead from Alfred Drake, starring in the show for over a year, in New York and on tour. This re-ignited Hollywood's interest in him.

RKO and Universal

Andes appeared as Marilyn Monroe's sweetheart and Barbara Stanwyck's brother in the cult film Clash by Night (1952), directed by Fritz Lang and co-written by Clifford Odets, for RKO.

Also for that studio, he played the heroic Lt. Maynard in Blackbeard, the Pirate (1952) and a supporting role in Split Second (1953).

In 1953 he starred in a short-lived Broadway musical, Maggie.

In 1954, he signed a new contract with RKO even though that studio had kept him idle for a year, causing him to miss a part in The High and the Mighty. He was under contract to RKO for three years.

He co-starred with Angela Lansbury in the film noir A Life at Stake (1954) and was one of several male leads in The Second Greatest Sex (1955) at Universal, where he signed a long-term contract.

Andes begin guest starring on TV shows like Celebrity Playhouse, The Ford Television Theatre, Matinee Theatre, The Loretta Young Show, Conflict and Playhouse 90. He also starred in TV adaptations of The Great Waltz (playing Johann Strauss, Jr.), Bloomer Girl (1956) and Holiday (based on The Grand Tour) (1956).

He made two films with Jeff Chandler at Universal, Away All Boats (1956) and Pillars of the Sky (1956), and did Back from Eternity (1956) at RKO. In 1956, he starred in a pilot for the series Doctor Mike, that was not picked up.

At Universal, he had a role in Interlude (1957), then he appeared in The Girl Most Likely (1958), the last film made by RKO.

Andes guest starred on Jane Wyman Presents The Fireside Theatre, Goodyear Theatre, Alcoa Theatre and The Gale Storm Show: Oh! Susanna.

In 1958, Andes starred as crusading former Louisiana State Police Superintendent Francis Grevemberg in the film Damn Citizen at Universal. His co-stars were Margaret Hayes as Dorothy Maguire Grevemberg and Gene Evans as Police Major Al Arthur.

He starred in two low-budget features: Model for Murder (1959) in England and Surrender - Hell! (1960) in the Philippines.

Television
Andes was cast in a regular series, playing Frank Dawson in the police drama This Man Dawson (1959–60), the story of a former United States Marine Corps colonel who is hired to stop police corruption in a large, unnamed city. William Conrad did the series narration.

On Broadway, Andes starred opposite Lucille Ball in the musical Wildcat (1960–61) which ran for 175 performances.

When Wildcat ended Andes resumed his television career, guest starring on Sea Hunt, Have Gun - Will Travel, Follow the Sun, Vacation Playhouse and The Rifleman.

In 1963, Andes was cast with Victor Buono and Arch Johnson in the episode "Firebug" of the anthology series GE True, hosted by Jack Webb. In the story line, Buono portrays Charles Colvin, a barber in Los Angeles, who is by night a pyromaniac. The United States Forest Service works to find Colvin before he can set more fires.

Later in 1963, Andes was cast in a regular role as the lawyer-husband on the 1963 sitcom Glynis, starring Glynis Johns as his wife, a mystery writer and amateur sleuth.

He guest-starred on 77 Sunset Strip, Perry Mason (in the episode "Illicit Illusion"), The Outer Limits (in the episode "Expanding Human"), Mickey Rooney's short-lived sitcom Mickey, The Littlest Hobo, Death Valley Days, Valentine's Day, Branded, The Lucy Show, and Run for Your Life.

Andes starred as the manager of a radio station in the serial Paradise Bay, which debuted September 27, 1965.

He returned to guest-star roles in Daniel Boone, The Andy Griffith Show, Star Trek (in the episode "The Apple"), and I Spy.

His work included voice acting in the animated Birdman and the Galaxy Trio (1967) as Birdman. In 1967, he toured in a production of Man of La Mancha.

Later career
He appeared as General George C. Marshall in the film Tora! Tora! Tora! and in the biker movie Hell's Bloody Devils (1970).

He guest-starred on Petticoat Junction, The Bold Ones: The New Doctors, Dan August, The Streets of San Francisco, Search, Gunsmoke, Cannon, Caribe, and The Magical World of Disney ("Twister, Bull from the Sky").

His later appearances included the films ...And Justice for All (1979) and The Ultimate Impostor (1979) as well as playing Minister Darius in the Buck Rogers in the 25th Century episode "Buck's Duel to the Death".

His last appearance was in the TV movie Blinded by the Light (1980). He then retired. He later said "I was divorced, my kids were grown, and that is when I bought a boat and lived on it and ran charters on it over to Catalina and down to Mexico and back. I just had a ball."

Personal life 
On November 30, 1946, Andes married Jean A. Cotton, a nurse, in Upper Darby, Pennsylvania. The couple divorced in 1961. They had two sons: musicians Mark Andes (in bands Spirit, Jo Jo Gunne, Firefall and Heart) and Matt Andes (also a member of Spirit and Jo Jo Gunne).

In 1961, he married Sheila Hackett during a break in Wildcat.

Death 
On November 11, 2005, Andes was found dead at the age of 85 at his home in Santa Clarita, California.
He had been suffering from bladder cancer and other ailments (he had been a smoker). His death was ruled as suicide by asphyxiation, according to a report from the Los Angeles County Coroner's Office. His remains were donated to medical science.

Filmography

References

External links 

 
 
 

1920 births
2005 deaths
20th-century American male actors
20th-century American singers
20th-century American male singers
Alumni of the University of Oxford
American expatriates in the United Kingdom
American male film actors
American male musical theatre actors
American male radio actors
American male television actors
American male voice actors
Male actors from Santa Clarita, California
Male actors from New Jersey
Male actors from New York City
Male actors from Philadelphia
Musicians from Philadelphia
People from Newhall, Santa Clarita, California
People from Ocean City, New Jersey
Singers from Pennsylvania
Suicides by asphyxiation
Suicides in California
Temple University College of Education alumni
University of the Arts (Philadelphia) alumni
2005 suicides
United States Army Air Forces personnel of World War II